Holy Matrimony is a 1994 American comedy film directed by Leonard Nimoy and starring Patricia Arquette and Joseph Gordon-Levitt. The film tells the story of a beautiful thief, hiding in a small, isolated Hutterite community, who marries a young boy in order to retrieve a hidden fortune following the death of her boyfriend, who was also the older brother of her current husband. It was the final feature film directed by Nimoy.

Plot

A young couple, Havana and Peter, robs a county fair of its daily receipts and escapes to Canada to hide out in the Hutterite community where Peter was raised.

While there, they marry to satisfy the conservative elders in the community. Peter hides their loot but then is killed in a car wreck. His much younger brother Zeke is called upon to replace his brother and marry Havana in a levirate marriage.

Zeke already hates Havana because he believes that she influences his elder brother's behavior. She begins looking through everything that was Peter's, and Zeke rightly deduces that Peter hid something from her. He finds the money, along with a newspaper article that mentions Peter as the prime suspect in the robbery.

Zeke initially uses the cash to trick his bride into doing housework. Later he shows it to the elders, who deem that it should be returned to its rightful owners. Zeke and Havana (who claims innocence of the source of the money) are sent on a quest back to the US to return the money.

During this quest, the two eventually forget their initial animosity and grow protective of each other. When Havana kisses him goodbye, Zeke promises to return and give her a real kiss when he is older.

Cast 
Patricia Arquette as Betsy "Havana" Iggins
Joseph Gordon-Levitt as Ezekiel "Zeke" Jacobson
Armin Mueller-Stahl as Wilhelm Jacobson
Tate Donovan as Peter Jacobson
John Schuck as Markowski
Lois Smith as Orna Jacobson
Courtney B. Vance as Cooper 
Jeffrey Nordling as Link
Richard Riehle as Greeson 
Mary Pat Gleason as Female Officer 
Alaine Byrne as Bar Woman 
Dan Cossolini as Bartender 
Lori Alan as Cleopatra 
Jess Schwidde as Samuel 
Franz Novak as Teacher

Reception 
Holy Matrimony received negative reviews from critics and was a box office failure, grossing just a little over $715,000 in its limited release.

The authors Rod Janzen and Max Stanton stated in their book The Hutterites in North America: "The film [...] provides a very inaccurate portrait of Hutterites". For example, levirate marriage does not exist among Hutterites. People have to dress in a moderate way, when they are at a Hutterite colony. It's only possible for baptized members of the Hutterite community to marry at a colony.

Year-end lists 
7th worst – Sean P. Means, The Salt Lake Tribune
 Worst films (not ranked) – Jeff Simon, The Buffalo News

References

External links
 
 
 

1994 films
1990s buddy comedy films
1990s comedy road movies
American buddy comedy films
American comedy road movies
Anabaptism in popular culture
1990s chase films
Films about dysfunctional families
Films about human rights
Films about religion
Films about weddings
Films directed by Leonard Nimoy
Hollywood Pictures films
Hutterites in Canada
Interscope Communications films
PolyGram Filmed Entertainment films
Films with screenplays by Douglas S. Cook
Films with screenplays by David Weisberg
Films scored by Bruce Broughton
1994 comedy films
1990s English-language films
1990s American films